The Moderate Party is a minor third party in New Jersey made of centrist former members of the Republican Party, claiming that the party has shifted too far right following the election of Donald Trump in 2016 and the storming of the capital on January 6.

Foundation

The party was founded in the summer of 2022 in preparation for the election of that year. The party was co-founded by Rick Wolfe, former Republican mayor of East Amwell Township and Michelle Garay, former Republican mayor of Alexandria Township with Wolfe going on to be the party's spokesman and Garay the chairwoman. After the foundation of the party, Wolfe stated in interviews that the intention of the party was to "save (the Republican Party) from extremism" and that the party consisted of both Republicans and Democrats who are tired of political bickering and deadlock. Wolfe claims that New Jerseyites want candidates who will support their communities and values and not participate in a larger nationwide culture war.

Fusion voting

The centerpiece of the party's aspirations is the restoration of the practice of fusion voting in New Jersey, and eventually implement the practice nationally. The practice would allow a candidate to appear on a ballot multiple times for multiple parties allowing for voters to vote for a candidate even if they disagree with their party's nationwide affiliation. The practice was made legal in the state in 1911 under the direction of then Governor Woodrow Wilson but the practice was outlawed in a series of laws passed in 1921 and 1922. Lee Drutman of New America stated that restoring fusion voting in New Jersey would allow voters to signal they want their representative to be compromise with the opposition. However, lawsuits to restore the practice have been defeated in the New Jersey court systems thrice, once in 1997 by the New Jersey Conservative Party, another time in 1999 by a joint lawsuit by both the Green Party of New Jersey and New Jersey Libertarian Party and a third time in 2001 from a lawsuit by private citizens.

The party hopes that by bringing back fusion voting that it would incentivize voters to vote with their conscience more so than party affiliation, and allow Democrats to vote for centrist Republicans, and Republicans to vote for centrist Democrats, without having to vote for the opposing party directly. Unfortunately for the party, their attempts to restore the practice have been met with disappointment, with the Secretary of State of New Jersey, Tahesha Way, tossing the party's petition to restore the practice twice. However, lower appeal courts are hearing their petitions with the party hoping their case reaches the Supreme Court of New Jersey by the end of 2023 and eventually be enshrined in an amendment in the Constitution of New Jersey. The party also hopes that their case will reach the Supreme Court of the United States to make the practice legal nationally.

The party has seen support from Protect Democracy for their mission of federal fusion voting. The party has also seen support from local members of the Working Families Party and their New Jersey state Director, Sue Altman, as the party would also benefit from the restoration of fusion voting in New Jersey.

2022 election

The party found support for their mission from Representative Tom Malinowski, who had seen his district redrawn to include a larger Republican voter base. In reaction to his shifting voter base, Malinowski had rebranded himself as a more centrist candidate and as a fiscal conservative, despite getting into a spat with an actual centrist and fiscally conservative Democratic representative from New Jersey, Josh Gottheimer earlier in his term over the latter not being progressive enough. The party has also attacked Thomas Kean Jr., Malinowski's Republican opponent, for accepting Donald Trump's endorsement. Malinowski fully backed the party and accepted their endorsement despite them not being able to put his name on the ballot a second time, and said that the Moderate Party “alliance between Democrats of all stripes, independents and moderate Republicans”. The party has also drawn support from centrist members of the Democratic party who claim that the party has shifted too far to the left. Additionally, Malinowski, has reached out to both Liz Cheney and Adam Kinzinger to one day join the party should it ever reach national levels of support. Malinowski would go on to be defeated by Kean 48.5% to 51.5%.

Criticism

The party has faced criticism from the local New Jersey Republican State Committee, and from Malinowski's Republican opponent Thomas Kean Jr.. These criticisms mostly stem from the fact the party, and its PAC, the Moderate Party Independent Fund which spent $152,000 running attack ads against Kean, are entirely bankrolled by $500,000 from Nancy Pelosi, Michael Bloomberg, Fred Eychaner and James Simons. Additionally Wolfe and Malinowski are from the same hometown casting a shadow on if the party is truly for bipartisan support, or if it is just a Princeton borough political club. The strong involvement of Sue Helm and the Working Families Party in the party's foundation also didn't help win over Republican voters. Espiecally since Sue Helm is a product of the South Jersey Democratic Political machine led by George Norcross. In response to Malinowski's endorsement by the party, Kean stated:

“Perhaps Tom Malinowski simply thinks nobody would notice, or perhaps this is a more brazen attempt to subvert democracy and benefit his own political stock”

“However you cut it, this is a dishonest attempt to fool voters in an astoundingly tough election year for Washington Democrats.”

“(Malinowski) created an entirely false party with an entirely false premise through less than transparent means that is 100% funded by Nancy Pelosi’s super PAC from beginning to end.”

“once again, not even the law can get between Trader Tom and his political ambitions.”

Additionally, Tom Szymanski, executive director of the New Jersey Republican State Committee, stated in response to the establishment of the Moderate Party and it's endorsement of Malinowski that:

"(the Moderate Party) Is an illegal, Democrat-funded scam designed to deceive voters."

“Malinowski preaches all day long about the sanctity of democracy, and yet now that his own job and taxpayer-funded paycheck is on the line, he tried to do an end-run around the New Jersey Constitution and break the law by having his name appear on the ballot twice”

“It reeks of desperation and Malinowski knows he is going to lose to Tom Kean in November.”

Additionally Raritan Valley Community College professor Glenn Ricketts offered skepticism of the parties prospective success citing continual failure of third parties in America and successfully predicted that it may end up hurting Malinowski's campaign.

Post 2022 election

Following the defeat of Malinowski in the 2022 election, the party insisted that their mission had not ended and re-focused their efforts on the New Jersey State Senate and New Jersey General Assembly elections, hoping to field candidates in each race either as Democrats, Republicans or stand alone Moderates to hopefully make the prospect of implementing fusion voting via the state legislature less of a fantasy. Additionally, they hope that a supreme court ruling on fusion voting will come by July or August 2023.

Their efforts to restore fusion voting have been bolstered by a poll by Braun Research for Fairleigh Dickinson University which stated that 56% of New Jerseyites supported restoring the practice in the state. Additionally, another poll by Braun Research, this time on behalf of the New America Foundation, found that 68% of New Jerseyites support fusion voting, and 81% of New Jerseyites are discontent with the two party system.

Party platform

Besides fusion voting, the parties beliefs as outlined on their website are as follows:

 Eliminate political extremism
 Support bipartisanship
 Tackle local instead of national issues
 Protect the foundations of American democracy
 Fiscal conservatism
 Immigration reform
 "Facts-based" legislation
 Government transparency

References

2022 establishments in New Jersey
Political parties established in 2022
Moderate Party